Les Issambres is a French village situated on the  coastline of the Bay of Saint Tropez, between the Mediterranean sea and the wooded hills of the Massif des Maures.

History 
The seaside and holiday destination of the commune of Roquebrune-sur-Argens, France stretches along 8 km of inlets and fine sandy beaches. Its incarnation as a resort took place in the 1930s with the development of Hotel La Résidence (now named Hôtel club Vacanciel des Issambres) above La Garonette Beach. Clearly conspicuous from the sea, it is located in the Val d' Esquieres, which Les Issambres shares with the commune of Sainte Maxime. Eastwards on the beach is the sailing center with boat rentals and a sailing school, a protected boat harbour with some marine shops, dive center and restaurants. There is a ferry (Les Bateaux Verts) that takes passengers to the Sainte Maxime harbour or Saint Tropez.

On August 15, 1944, the beaches of Saint Tropez, Sainte Maxime and Les Issambres were at the center of Operation Dragoon, the invasion and liberation of Southern France during World War II. US Delta Force from 93rd Evac landed there. Near the entrance to La Garonette  beach is a memorial of the landing honoring US troops. The sailing centre is named La Batterie as it was the location of a German artillery battery.

Further to the east is the village San-Peïre sur mer that has grown gradually after WW2. This is really the centre of the destination with shops, restaurants, hotels, promenade, village beach and a town square with a Monday outdoor market, post and tourist office. Continuing eastwards there is a winding coastline with creeks, rocks and "calanques" versus Saint- Aygulf (Fréjus commune). There are numerous nature trails including a coastline trail leading to a 2000-year-old Roman fishpond. Many private houses are climbing up the mountain hills. However virtually all buildings – including hotels – keep a low profile to the contrary to locations further east on the French Riviera.

See also
Communes of the Var department

References

External links

 Roquebrune sur Argens commune website
 Les Issambres and Roquebrune Tourist Office website
 The harbour of Les Issambres official site

French Riviera
Geography of Var (department)